In criminal justice, clearance rate is calculated by dividing the number of crimes that are "cleared" (a charge being laid) by the total number of crimes recorded. Clearance rates are used by various groups as a measure of crimes solved by the police. 

Clearance rates can be problematic for measuring the performance of police services and for comparing various police services. This is because a police force may employ a different way of measuring clearance rates. For example, each police force may have a different method of recording when a "crime" has occurred and different criteria for determining when a crime has been "cleared." A given police force may appear to have a much better clearance rate because of its calculation methodology.

Some U.S. police forces have been criticized for overuse of "exceptional clearance", which is intended to classify as "cleared" cases where probably cause to arrest a suspect exists, but police are unable to do so for reasons outside their control (such as death or incarceration in a foreign country).

In System Conflict Theory, it is argued that clearance rates cause the police to focus on appearing to solve crimes (generating high clearance rate scores) rather than actually solving crimes. Further focus on clearance rates may result in effort being expended to attribute crimes (correctly or incorrectly) to a criminal, which may not result in retribution, compensation, rehabilitation or deterrence.

References

Further reading
 Schmalleger, Frank. Criminal Justice Today, An Introductory Text For The 21st Century.

External links
  - "The Post has mapped more than 52,000 homicides in major American cities over the past decade and found that across the country, there are areas where murder is common but arrests are rare."

See also
 Criminal investigation
 List of unsolved deaths

Criminology
Law enforcement
Crime statistics
Ratios
Social statistics indicators